Jim Laver Carter (born June 24, 1961) is an American professional golfer who plays on the Champions Tour. He has also played on the PGA Tour and the Nationwide Tour.

Biography
Carter was born in Spring Lake, North Carolina. As a high school senior, he led Mesa High's boys golf team to an Arizona state championship in 1979. He attended Arizona State University in Tempe and was a distinguished member of the golf team – a two-time first-team All-American and an All-Pac-10 conference selection, as well as the 1983 NCAA Champion (Arizona State University's first individual champion in men's golf). He also represented the U.S. Collegians at the USA vs. Japan Matches at Pebble Beach and was named Ambassador.  He won the 1981 and 1984 Arizona State Amateur Championship, and the 1983 and 1984 Southwest Amateur Championship. He was three times named Arizona's amateur golfer of the year.  He was honored with the Arizona State University Athlete of the Year award in 1984. He was also awarded the conference PAC-10 Medal, the highest honor a student athlete can receive. In 1995, he was inducted into the Arizona State University Athletic Hall of Fame. In 2007 he was inducted into the Mesa City Sports Hall of Fame.

Carter turned pro in 1985. In contrast to his college career, Carter's level of success as a tour professional has been very modest. He won once on the Nationwide Tour in 1994, and once on the PGA Tour in 2000. Qualifying for the PGA Tour has been a constant struggle; however, he managed to qualify for the elite tour in 15 of the 19 years between 1987 and 2005. His best finish in a major championship was T-24 at the 2002 U.S. Open. Carter lives in Scottsdale, Arizona.

In 2011, Carter played in The Senior Open Championship (missed cut) and U.S. Senior Open (finished tied for 50th), his first two career Champions Tour events. He finished 6th at the 2011 Champions Tour Q School, just missing out on earning a Champions Tour card, but earned automatic entry as Q School medalist Jeff Freeman did not turn 50 until April 2012.

Personal life
Carter earned a Business degree in 1984 from Arizona State University. He is a resident of Scottsdale, Arizona.

Amateur wins
1979 Arizona state high school (Mesa High) team championship, Mesa City Amateur
1981 Arizona State Amateur
1983 Southwestern Amateur, NCAA Championship
1984 Arizona State Amateur, Southwestern Amateur

Professional wins (12)

PGA Tour wins (1)

Nike Tour wins (1)

Nike Tour playoff record (0–2)

Other wins (10)
1986 Kingman Open
1987 Scottsdale Healthcare Classic
1989 Arizona Open
1992 Wigwam Classic
1996 Arizona Open
2004 Tommy Bahama Desert Marlin
2013 Arizona Senior Open
2014 Arizona Senior Open
2020 Arizona Senior Open, Lone Star NGL Texas Senior Open

Results in major championships

CUT = missed the half-way cut
WD = withdrew
"T" = tied
Note: Carter never played in the Masters Tournament.

See also
1986 PGA Tour Qualifying School graduates
1987 PGA Tour Qualifying School graduates
1994 Nike Tour graduates
2004 PGA Tour Qualifying School graduates

References

External links

American male golfers
Arizona State Sun Devils men's golfers
PGA Tour golfers
PGA Tour Champions golfers
Korn Ferry Tour graduates
Golfers from North Carolina
Mesa High School alumni
People from Spring Lake, North Carolina
Golfers from Scottsdale, Arizona
1961 births
Living people